Scott Anderson (born February 18, 1990) is an American racing driver from Fort Collins, Colorado.

Anderson began racing karts in the Colorado Sprint Championship. He made the move to cars in Sports Car Club of America Spec Racer Ford. In 2010 he made his professional debut in U.S. F2000 National Championship. In 2011 he won the Skip Barber National Championship and a scholarship for a full season of U.S. F2000 in 2012 where he finished third with two wins for Belardi Auto Racing.

In 2013 he moved up the Road to Indy and raced in the Pro Mazda Championship for Juncos Racing; finished fifth in points with one podium and seven top 5s. In 2014 Anderson progressed to Indy Lights with Fan Force United, which returned to the series after a one-year hiatus. Anderson finished eighth in points with a best finish of fourth at the Milwaukee Mile. In 2015 he returned to the series, driving for Schmidt Peterson Motorsports. In 2016, he began racing in Red Bull Global Rallycross Lites with CORE Autosport beginning in Seattle. In the final race of 2016, he finished in second place behind eventual series champion, Cabot Bigham.
In 2017-2019 Scott raced in Americas Rallycross (ARX)

Racing record

SCCA National Championship Runoffs

U.S. F2000 National Championship

Pro Mazda Championship

Indy Lights

Complete Global Rallycross results

GRC Lites

References

External links
 
 
 

1990 births
Living people
Sportspeople from Fort Collins, Colorado
Racing drivers from Colorado
Formula Ford drivers
Indy Pro 2000 Championship drivers
Indy Lights drivers
SCCA National Championship Runoffs participants
U.S. F2000 National Championship drivers
Belardi Auto Racing drivers
Arrow McLaren SP drivers
Juncos Hollinger Racing drivers
Global RallyCross Championship drivers
JDC Motorsports drivers